Ballinlough could refer to one of the following places in Ireland:
Ballinlough, Bunown, a townland in the civil parish of Bunown, barony of Kilkenny West, County Westmeath
Ballinlough, Cork
Ballinlough, County Meath
Ballinlough, County Roscommon
Ballinlough Castle, County Westmeath
Ballinlough, Killua, a townland in the civil parish of Killua, barony of Delvin, County Westmeath